Rio Bravo is a container ship owned by A.P. Moller Singapore Pte. Ltd. and operated by Maersk Line AS. Originally owned by Rio Bravo GmbH & Co KG, a subsidiary of Hamburg Süd, she has had two owners and been registered under three flags.

The vessel is one of three ships of the Rio class built for Hamburg Süd by Daewoo Mangalia Heavy Industries in 2009.

Construction
Rio Bravo had its keel laid down on 7 July 2008 at Daewoo Mangalia Heavy Industries in Mangalia, Romania.

The ship's gross tonnage, a measure of the volume of all its enclosed spaces, is 73,899. Its net tonnage, which measures the volume of the cargo spaces, is 39,673.

The vessel was built with a Doosan Engine Co. Ltd. 8RTA96C main engine, which drives a fixed pitch propeller. The 8-cylinder engine has a Maximum Continuous Rating of 45,765 kW with 102 revolutions per minute at MCR. The cylinder bore is 960mm. The vessel's steam piping system features an Aalborg CH 8-500 auxiliary boiler.

Construction of the ship was completed on 18 August 2009.

Notes

References

Merchant ships
2009 ships